Sharon Wilkins is an American actress.

Wilkins is from Newburgh, New York, and makes her home on the Upper West Side of Manhattan in New York City, New York. 

She has had a number of roles on Broadway and in film and does some commercial work.

Career
Wilkins appeared in the national tour of Xanadu. She has appeared in three Broadway musicals, first  Life in 1997, followed by Seussical in 2000 and All Shook Up in 2005.

Since 2005, she has been focusing mostly on television and film work appearing in  shows including Law and Order: Special Victims Unit, 30 Rock and Rescue Me and such films as National Treasure (2004) and We Own the Night (2007).

She is active in Broadway Cares/Equity Fights AIDS.

Filmography

Film

Television

References

External links
 
 

21st-century American actresses
21st-century African-American women singers 
Actresses from New York City
African-American actresses
American film actresses 
American musical theatre actresses
American television actresses
Broadway theatre people
Living people
People from Newburgh, New York
 People from the Upper West Side
Year of birth missing (living people)